Paul McMurtry is an American politician from Massachusetts. A Democrat, he has served in the Massachusetts House of Representatives since 2007. He represents the Eleventh Norfolk District, which includes his hometown of Dedham, Westwood, and the Eighth Precinct of Walpole.

McMurtry attended elementary school at the now-closed Dexter School in Dedham, and graduated from Dedham High School. He earned his B.S.B.A. in Management from Northeastern University. He has been self-employed since the age of twenty as the owner of several small businesses, including PM Productions, a video store he created while in college, and the Dedham Community Theatre, which he currently owns and operates. McMurtry is actively involved in the local branch of Rotary International, where he served twice as club president.

Representative McMurtry ran in a special election in 2007 to replace outgoing Representative Robert Coughlin. McMurtry ran as an independent having not held any prior elected office. He won a plurality of the vote in the three way race, garnering 37.6% of the vote overall and 53.8% in his hometown of Dedham. McMurtry ran unopposed for re-election in every subsequent biannual election until John McDonald challenged him in 2018.

Personal life 
McMurtry is Catholic and is a member of the Knights of Columbus.

Political career 
In 2018, McMurtry was one of the original sponsors of Bill H.4479, which placed restrictions on e-cigarettes and raised the age for buying tobacco from 18 to 21. Citing the increasing vaping epidemic among youth, McMurtry sponsored the bill in able to "prevent young people from taking up the deadly habit and getting addicted to nicotine products". Governor Charlie Baker subsequently signed McMurtry's legislation.

The same year, McMurtry filed legislation to protect independent auto repair shops against vehicle manufacturers. Some vehicle manufacturers use wireless technology to bypass current right to repair information sharing laws, and McMurtry's bill intends to renew discussion on keeping laws updated with the progress of technology.

In January 2019, The Boston Globe reported that McMurtry allegedly "walked up behind an incoming legislator and grabbed her backside during an orientation cocktail hour for newly elected members." McMurtry denied the allegations.  The Globe also reported that McMurtry put an aide on leave after the aide filed a lengthy complaint against McMurtry's chief of staff.  The aide was given a one year's salary, signed a nondisclosure agreement, and resigned.

Electoral history

See also
 2019–2020 Massachusetts legislature
 2021–2022 Massachusetts legislature

References

External links
Legislative Homepage
www.paulmcmurtry.org/
Dedham Community Theatre

Democratic Party members of the Massachusetts House of Representatives
Living people
Northeastern University alumni
Dedham High School alumni
21st-century American politicians
Catholics from Massachusetts
1965 births
Politicians from Dedham, Massachusetts